Vilankulo District or Vilanculos District is a district of Inhambane Province in south-east Mozambique. Its principal town is Vilankulo. The district is located at the east of the province, and borders with Inhassoro District in the north and Massinga District in the south and in the west. In the east, the district is bounded by the Indian Ocean. It has a population of 135,710 as of 2007.

Geography
The climate is tropical arid in the interior of the district and tropical humid at the coast. The annual rainfall at the coast achieves , mainly falling in February and March.

Administrative divisions
The district is divided into two postos, Vilankulo (three localities) and Mapinhane (three localities).

Demographics
As of 2005, 42% of the population of the district was younger than 15 years. 39% did speak Portuguese. The population was predominantly speaking Chopi language. 64% were analphabetic, mostly women.

Economy
In 2005, 1% of the households in the district had electricity. Woodcutting and fishery belong to traditional meand of subsistence of the population of the district.

Agriculture
In 2005, the district had 26,000 farms exploiting on average the area of  each. The main agricultural products are maize, cassava, cowpea, and peanuts.

Transportation

Vilankulo has an international airport. It, in particular, serves as a base for charter flights to Bazaruto Island Airport located on the Bazaruto Archipelago.

References

Districts in Inhambane Province